Magnus Carlson (born 3 August 1968) is a Swedish singer, composer, songwriter, DJ, and record collector. After playing in various cover bands in the nineties he formed the indie group, Weeping Willows. Their 1997 debut album was an instant success and the band soon became a national household name. 
In 2003 Magnus launched what would become a very successful solo career. One that now has established him as one of the biggest male artists in Sweden today. He has released a total of 16 albums in the last twenty years, several of them gold and platinum records and he's collaborated with more artists than even he can remember. From duets with songstress Anna Ternheim to house tracks with members of Swedish House Mafia; from performing Velvet Underground-covers with Nina Persson of The Cardigans and Ebbot Lundberg of The Soundtrack of Our Lives to selling out concert halls performing an acclaimed Royal Symphony Orchestral tribute to the late David Bowie onto playing horns with Noel Gallagher's High Flying Birds.

But at the heart of his passion for music lies an overall love of the sixties. That is particularly evident in his most recent releases. In the autumn of 2017, he released a string of authentic northern soul singles followed up by Motown/Spector-influenced Christmas mini-album together with Weeping Willows. A new, through-and-through, jazz EP is lined up for release in 2018, as is his first ever full-length solo album in the UK, which was largely recorded and produced by Andy Lewis at Paul Weller's Black Barn studio in Surrey.

Discography

Albums
2001 – Allt är bara du, du, du - featuring Håkan Hellström, Mick Jones and Joakim Thåström
2006 – Ett Kungarike För En Kram
2009 – Magnus Carlson & The Moon Ray Quintet
2010 – Echoes
2013 – Tandem Sky
2016 – Tolkningarna – Så mycket bättre Säsong 7
2017 – Den långa vägen hem

References

External links
Official MySpace

1968 births
Living people
Singers from Stockholm
Swedish pop singers
English-language singers from Sweden